Song Ok-joo (born 20 December 1965) is a South Korean politician and two-term parliamentarian currently representing Hwaseong at the National Assembly.

From 1996 to 2016 Song had worked for her party and its preceding parties in areas of policy coordination, public relations and education. From 2011 to 2012 she was a policy researcher at the National Assembly upon the nomination of her party. In the 2012 general election, she was placed as the number 31 on the proportional representation list of her party. In the 2016 general election, she was placed as the number 3 on the list.

After becoming a parliamentarian in 2016, she took multiple roles in her party such as its spokesperson, deputy floor leader and deputy chair of Policy Planning Committee.

In the 2020 general election, she won the constituency which was previously represented by a senior opposition figure and eight-term parliamentarian, Suh Chung-won, and only taken by opposition parties ever since it was created in 2008.

In 2020 she was elected as the chair of National Assembly's Environment and Labor Committee responsible for scrutinising Ministry of Environment, Ministry of Employment and Labor and related agencies.

Song holds two degrees from Yonsei University - a bachelor in communication and a master's in administration.

Electoral history

References 

Living people
1965 births
Yonsei University alumni
Members of the National Assembly (South Korea)
Minjoo Party of Korea politicians
Female members of the National Assembly (South Korea)